Pippa Wetzell (born 26 January 1977) is a New Zealand television personality and journalist with TVNZ 1.

Early life
Wetzell attended Takapuna Grammar School on Auckland's North Shore, where she was Head Girl in 1994. She went on to study at the Auckland University of Technology, graduating with a Bachelor of Communications degree.

Career
She was hired by Television New Zealand in 1998 for the overnight assignments desk. She has had several roles at TV ONE's breakfast television programme Breakfast, starting as a junior meet-and-greet assistant before reporting news for the show. From 2001 she was a reporter for ONE News, later returning to Breakfast as back-up host for Kay Gregory. She has also presented the consumer affairs show Fair Go. Following Gregory's departure from Breakfast in 2007, she became co-host with Paul Henry. Wetzell left the show at the end of 2010.

Personal life
Wetzell is of German and Samoan heritage. She is married to lawyer Torrin Crowther, a competition law partner at Bell Gully. The couple have three children.

Pippa's younger brother, Yanni Wetzell, is a professional basketball player.

References

External links
 Pippa Wetzell at TVNZ

1977 births
People educated at Takapuna Grammar School
Auckland University of Technology alumni
Living people
New Zealand television presenters
New Zealand women television presenters
New Zealand television journalists
New Zealand women journalists
New Zealand people of Samoan descent
New Zealand people of German descent